Uffculme railway station was the station closest to the centre of the Culm Valley Light Railway in Devon and as such contained the passing loop.
The line ran approximately 9 miles from the Bristol to Penzance main line at Tiverton Junction to Hemyock on the Somerset border.

Since closure the station area has been totally redeveloped.

Description 
Uffculme station had a single platform with a loop, and a goods yard was opposite the passenger platform with had two sidings accessed from the loop. One of these served a loading dock with cattle pens.

Closure 
The Great Western Railway bought the line in April 1880 and opened it to freight after it became clear that it was unlikely to ever run profitably as a passenger line. Until grouping it operated as a joint freight line .

The line was planned for closure when the Beeching Report of 1963 was issued. After closure to passengers in 1963 the station remained open to freight traffic with only the goods yard and loop remaining in use until 8 May 1967, The line remained open until 1975 when it was abandoned.

References 

Disused railway stations in Devon
Former Great Western Railway stations
Railway stations in Great Britain opened in 1876
Railway stations in Great Britain closed in 1963